Wilcoxson and Company Bank, also known as the Farmer's Bank of Carrollton and Farmer's Bank of Bogard, is a historic bank building located at Carrollton, Carroll County, Missouri.  It was built in 1904, and consists of two two-story buildings, a corner building and a building that wraps around it on two sides.  The buildings are visually tied together by a denticulated projecting cornice and stone coping on the tall roof parapet.

It was listed on the National Register of Historic Places in 1983.

References

Bank buildings on the National Register of Historic Places in Missouri
Commercial buildings completed in 1904
Buildings and structures in Carroll County, Missouri
National Register of Historic Places in Carroll County, Missouri